Menin may refer to:

Menin, the French name for the Belgian town of Menen 
Menin, a little village in the municipality of Cesiomaggiore, Italy
Menin or MEN1, a tumor suppressor associated with multiple endocrine neoplasia type 1
Měnín, village and municipality in the Czech Republic
Menin (title), office in Ancien Régime France
Manin, Syria, old name of this Syrian village

See also
Menin Gate, a war memorial in Ypres, Belgium
Menin Gate at Midnight, a 1927 painting by Australian artist Will Longstaff